Michael Salafia is an Australian former professional rugby league footballer who played in the 1990s for Eastern Suburbs and Gold Coast Chargers of the Australian Rugby League. He played at  Micheal also holds the point scoring record for county rugby league.

Playing career
Salafia made his debut from the bench for Eastern Suburbs in round 8 of the 1995 ARL season. The next week, he played his first game in the starting line-up, replacing regular five-eighth Andrew Walker. The Roosters won the game, the only victory of Salafia's short career.

In 1996, Salafia joined the Gold Coast Chargers. He was in the starting side for the club's first game under the new moniker, but it was to be the last game he played.

After his retirement from professional football, Salafia went on to represent Italy, and Group 7.

References

 Whiticker, Alan and Hudson, Glen; The Encyclopedia of Rugby League Players; published 2005 by BAS publishing, f16/171 Collins St, Melbourne, Vic., 3000

Australian rugby league players
Italy national rugby league team players
Sydney Roosters players
Gold Coast Chargers players
Living people
Rugby league five-eighths
Year of birth missing (living people)
Place of birth missing (living people)